The George W. Bethers House, also known as the William Wyatt House, is a historic residence in Philomath, Oregon, United States.  It was listed on the National Register of Historic Places in 1997.

The house was built  and photos from 1900 show its Gothic Revival style.  In 1997 it was being renovated to restore its Gothic Revival appearance.  It is a two-story house with a cross-gable roof.

See also
National Register of Historic Places listings in Benton County, Oregon

References

1873 establishments in Oregon
Gothic Revival architecture in Oregon
Houses completed in 1873
Houses in Benton County, Oregon
Houses on the National Register of Historic Places in Oregon
National Register of Historic Places in Benton County, Oregon